Transport in Canberra is provided by private cars, buses, taxis and light rail (for travel within the city), while rail, air, and long-distance coach services operate for travel beyond Canberra. A vast road network also plays a major role in transport within and beyond the city.

Transport Canberra
On 1 July 2016, Transport Canberra, a division of Transport Canberra & City Services, was formed to manage all public transport operations within the Australian Capital Territory including ACTION bus services and light rail planning and construction, previously managed by the Capital Metro Agency.

Roads
The automobile is by far the dominant form of transport in Canberra. The city is laid out so that arterial roads connecting inhabited clusters run through undeveloped areas of open land or forest, which results in a low population density; this also means that idle land is available for the development of future transport corridors if necessary without the need to build tunnels or acquire developed residential land. In contrast, other capital cities in Australia have substantially less green space.

An example is the Tuggeranong Parkway which links Canberra's CBD and Tuggeranong, and bypasses Weston Creek. In most districts, discrete residential suburbs are bounded by main arterial roads with only a few residential linking in, to deter non-local traffic from cutting through areas of housing.

In an effort to improve road safety, traffic cameras were first introduced to Canberra by the Kate Carnell Government in 1999. The traffic cameras installed in Canberra include fixed red-light and speed cameras and point-to-point speed cameras; together they bring in revenue of approximately $11 million per year in fines.

Bus

ACTION

The largest public transport operator is the Government of the Australian Capital Territory owned ACTION. In July 1926 the Federal Capital Commission commenced operating bus services in Canberra. With the opening of Old Parliament House in May 1927 and the associated relocation of Australian Commonwealth Government departments to Canberra, the frequency of service offered by the Canberra City Omnibus Service increased as the population of the new city grew.

During the early 1950s, bus services were expanded to Narrabundah, Yarralumla and O'Connor. These routes were extended further in the late 1950s with the development of Dickson and Campbell.

In August 1963 the first Woden Valley services were introduced. Similar early services were provided for other areas. From 1961 the new Russell Offices complex demanded a growing number of additional peak services, including feeders from the city. The Canberra fleet grew from 25 buses in 1942 to over 90 in 1966.

In March 1968 a reformed bus network was introduced. This involved new bus timetables and driver schedules, based on regular services on all routes throughout the day with synchronised movements through the main centres. In February 1977, a new system was unveiled and the operation renamed Australian Capital Territory Internal Omnibus Network (ACTION).

Today ACTION operates routes throughout the Australian Capital Territory with a fleet of 456 buses.

CDC Canberra

CDC Canberra operates bus services from the neighbouring city of Queanbeyan into Canberra City. As well as these services it also has services that can run to the town of Yass. It is owned by ComfortDelGro Australia, who purchased the business in August 2012.

CDC Canberra is permitted to carry passengers within the Australian Capital Territory, with the previous restriction being lifted in June 2012.

Coach

Canberra is serviced by a number of long-distance coach operators operating out of the Jolimont Centre.
Greyhound Australia operate services to Melbourne and Sydney
Murrays operate services to Narooma, Sydney and Wollongong
NSW TrainLink operate services to Bombala, Cootamundra and Eden
V/Line operate services to Albury and Bairnsdale

Rail

Heavy
Walter Burley Griffin's masterplan for Canberra included a railway that was to run from Queanbeyan to the current Canberra railway station in Kingston then north along the causeway and over the Molonglo River to Russell, along Amaroo Street to Civic and then north out of the city along Lonsdale and Ijong Streets. But aside from the current section, the only other part constructed was the line as far as Civic, albeit to temporary standards to carry construction materials, this was removed in 1940.

Canberra has been serviced by trains from Sydney since March 1927 with the Federal City Express, Canberra Monaro Express, Southern Highlands Express and Canberra Express all having provided this link, the latter being operated by an XPT from August 1983 until February 1990. An overnight service was provided with a carriage detached from the Cooma Mail at Queanbeyan. From April 1962 until March 1975 a through carriage was detached from the Spirit of Progress at Goulburn providing a connection with Melbourne.

Today Canberra is serviced by three daily NSW TrainLink Xplorer services each way with three carriages to Sydney.

Light
The Canberra light rail stage 1 operates between Gungahlin Place and Canberra City, travelling along Flemington Road and Northbourne Avenue. An extension to Woden Valley (stage 2) is under construction.

High speed
Canberra has been on the map of various high-speed rail proposals since 1984. The last serious attempt with government backing was terminated in December 2000.

Ticketing
Canberra has an integrated ticketing system between bus and light rail using the MyWay, a smartcard system introduced in 2011 by ACTION.

Air

Canberra Airport is serviced by Qantas, QantasLink, Virgin Australia and FlyPelican with services to Adelaide, Brisbane, Gold Coast, Melbourne, Perth, Sydney, Newcastle and Dubbo. In September 2016, Singapore Airlines commenced operating international flights to Singapore and Wellington, and in February 2018, Qatar Airways commenced operating international flights to Doha.

References

External links
ACT Government - Transport for Canberra

Transport in Canberra